The 2009 VFF Bred Cup was the qualifying competition for the 2009–10 OFC Champions League.

The club who advanced to this tournament was Tafea FC, Vanuatu's sole representative at the competition. The competition was played in two separate championships, north and south, with each winner facing off in the overall final.

Northern Championship

Teams 
 Vaum United
 Autebule F.C.
 Air Supa
 Rainbow F.C.

Semi-finals

Final 
Vaum United advance to the overall final.

Southern Championship

Teams 
 Amicale FC
 Tafea FC
 Kings United
 Sele United (qualifying stage)
 Nalkutan FC

Qualifying stage 
Kings United win on aggregate 3-2*.

Semi-finals

First Leg

Second Leg 
Tafea F.C. win on aggregate 4-1*.Amicale F.C. win on aggregate 3-1.

Third-Place Match

Final 
Tafea F.C. advance to the overall final.
 The second-leg score is unknown, so the aggregate only counts the first leg score.

Overall Final 
Tafea F.C. qualified for the 2009–10 OFC Champions League.

References

2008–09 in Vanuatuan football
VFF National Super League seasons